is a manga based on the life of Megumi Yokota, a Japanese girl who was abducted when she was 13 years old by North Korean spies in 1977. The manga concept was conceived by her mother and father and was penned by Souichi Moto under their supervision.

Plot

The manga follows Megumi's final days in her home town before her abduction.

Anime

As of 2008, the Government of Japan announced an anime adaptation will be created from the manga. The anime is dubbed in Japanese, Korean, Chinese, English and Russian. In addition, there are Japanese dubbed versions with subtitles in French, German, Italian, and Spanish. The government authorized a free downloadable version, as well as a DVD release.

Cast
All Japanese cast members were asked by Kouichi Yamadera for participation through the Japan Actors Union (Nippairen). Yamadera said, "The abduction is an act of disregarding human rights, not accepted. We Japanese people should emphasize our anger."

See also
North Korea Kidnapped My Daughter
Abduction: The Megumi Yokota Story
North Korean abductions of Japanese citizens

References

External links
 MEGUMI Anime: download
 Government of Japan: Secretariat, Headquarters for the Abduction Issue
 

2004 manga
2008 anime OVAs
Futabasha manga
Seinen manga